Seo is a Korean surname and Japanese surname.

As a Korean surname, Seo is the most frequent romanization, but it may also be romanized as Suh, Surh, Sur, Seoh, So and Su. The surname most commonly represents the hanja . Seo can also be used as a single-syllable Korean given name or an element in many two-syllable Korean given names. The given name meaning differs based on the hanja used to write it. There are 53 hanja with the reading "seo" on the South Korean government's official list of hanja which may be registered for use in given names. The Chinese surname Xú also uses the same  character.

Historically, the Seo clan (瀬尾) was also one of the cadet branches of the Hata clan who are descended from Prince Yuzuki no Kimi, a descendant of Emperor Qin Shi Huang of the Chinese Qin dynasty. The remaining variants are used by less than 2,000 individuals each and are generally used by related families.

Possible Writings
Japanese

Korean surname

Art and entertainment

Film and television
Seo Yea-ji, South Korean actress
Seo Do-young, South Korean actor
Seo Hyun-jin, South Korean actress and singer
Seo Ji-hoon, South Korean actor 
Seo Ji-seok, South Korean actor
Seo Hyo-rim, South Korean actress
Seo Kang-joon, South Korean actor and singer, member of actor group 5urprise
Seo Min-jung, South Korean actress
Seo Shin-ae, South Korean actress
Seo Woo-jin, South Korean child actor and model
Caroline Suh, Korean–American documentary film director and producer

Music
Seo Dong-hyeon (stage name Samuel Seo), South Korean singer-songwriter, rapper, and record producer
Seo Dong-hyeon (stage name Big Naughty), South Korean rapper
Seo Eun-kwang, South Korean singer, member and leader of boy band BtoB
Seo Hye-lin, South Korean singer and member of girl group EXID
Seo In-guk, South Korean singer and actor
Seo In-young, South Korean singer, dancer, model, television host, and actress
Seo Ji-young, South Korean singer
Seo Joo-hyun (stage name Seohyun), South Korean singer and actress, member of girl group Girls' Generation
Seo Jung-kwon (stage name Tiger JK), Korean-American rapper, record producer and entrepreneur
Seo Min-woo (1985–2018), South Korean singer and actor, member of boy group 100%
Seo Soo-jin South Korean singer and dancer, former member of girl group (G)I-DLE
Seo Yu-na, South Korean singer and actress, member of girl group AOA
Jeong Hyeon-cheol (stage name Seo Taiji), South Korean singer, musician, songwriter and record producer
Susie Suh, Korean-American folk-rock singer-songwriter
Angela Seo (born Hyunhye Seo), experimental musician and member of Xiu Xiu

Visual arts
Do-ho Suh, South Korean sculptor and installation artist
Seo Soo-kyoung (known as SEO), South Korean contemporary artist
Seo Ae-jin (known as Showry), South Korean video blogger
Suh Yongsun, South Korean painter and sculptor
Hee Seo, South Korean ballet dancer, principal dancer at the American Ballet Theatre

Sports

Football
Seo Dong-myung, former South Korean football goalkeeper
Seo Hyuk-su, former Korean-Australian football player
Seo Jung-won, former South Korean football player and coach

Other
Jae Weong Seo, retired South Korean baseball player
Hee-kyung Seo, former South Korean professional golfer
Seo Ho-jin, former South Korean speed skater and Olympic athlete
Seo Jang-hoon, former South Korean professional basketball player, entertainer and a variety show star
Seo Mi-jung, South Korean foil fencer
Seo Yoon-hee, South Korean badminton player
Suh Sung-in, South Korean boxer
Suh Yun-bok (1923–2017), South Korean marathoner
Seo Bok-seob, South Korean hapkido co-founder
Seo Seung-jae, South Korean badminton player
Seo Bong-soo, South Korean professional Go player
Seo Jae-pil, first naturalized Korean-American
Anna Wallis Suh (1900–1969), Methodist missionary, American expatriate, North Korean propagandist
Suh Nam-pyo, thirteenth president of the Korea Advanced Institute of Science and Technology
Suh Sang-chul, South Korean economist, educator and administrator
Seo Sang-ryun, South Korean minister, founder of first Korean Protestant church
Philip Jaisohn, first Korean to become a U.S. citizen
Seo Yong-duk, South Korean football midfielder
Seo Ji-hye, South Korean actress
Seo Whi-min, South Korean short track speed skater

Japanese surname 
 Akane Seo (瀬尾 茜, born 1988), Japanese sports coach and retired figure skater
 Akiko Seo (瀬尾 秋子, born 1984), Japanese gravure idol
 Aya Seo (瀬尾 有耶, born 1991), Japanese volleyball player
 Fumiko Seo (瀬尾 芙巳子, born 1929), Japanese academic, doctor, professor and emeritus of Kyoto University
 Hideki Seo (瀬尾 英樹, born 1974), Japanese fashion designer based in Paris, France
 Hirofumi Seo (瀬尾 拡史, born 1985), Japanese doctor and CEO of Sciement Co., Ltd.
 Hiroshi Seo (photographer) (瀬尾 央), Japanese photographer
 Hiroshi Seo (colonel) (瀬尾浩), late Japanese colonel of the 124th Division of the Imperial Japanese Army
 Ichizō Seo (瀬尾 一三, born 1947), Japanese singer-songwriter, music producer and music arranger
 Ikuo Seo (瀬尾 育生, born 1949), Japanese poet
 Kami Seo (瀬尾 佳美), Japanese environmental economist, professor and researcher
 Kaname Seo (瀬尾 要, 1891–1934), Japanese noh performing artist
 Kazuko Seo (瀬尾 和子, born 1971), Japanese television announcer
 Kazunori Seo (瀬尾 和紀, born 1974), Japanese musician
 Kazutoshi Seo (瀬尾 和寿, born 1981), stage name Kazu (カズ), Japanese comedian and member of comedy duo Kazu & Ai
 Keiko Seo (瀬尾 恵子, born 1960), Japanese voice actress
 Kentarō Seo (瀬尾 健太朗, born 1990), Japanese comedian and member of comedy duo THE SHEET
 Kiyoshi Seo (瀬尾 清, born 1970), Japanese soccer player
 Kobako Totan (小箱 とたん), real name Seo Kotoba (瀬尾 ことば), Japanese manga artist
 Kōji Seo (瀬尾 公治, born 1974), Japanese manga artist
 Koruto Seo (瀬尾 こると), Japanese novelist
 Kumekichi Yamamoto (山本 粂吉, née Seo (瀬尾), 1893–1974), Japanese politician and lawyer
 Kumi Seo (瀬尾 久美, born 1983), Japanese actress, model and talent
 Kyōko Seo (瀬尾 京子, born 1972), Japanese sports coach and retired gymnast 
 Magozaemon Seo ((瀬尾 孫左衛門), Edo era Japanese samurai
 Maiko Seo (瀬尾 まいこ, born 1974), Japanese novelist
 Masaru Seo (瀬尾 傑, born 1965), Japanese businessman, journalist and news pundit
 Mitsuyo Seo (瀬尾 光世, 1911–2010), Japanese animator, screenwriter and director
 Munetoshi Seo (瀬尾 宗利, born 1967), Japanese composer
 Nanae Seo (瀬尾 七重, born 1942), Japanese children's novelist
 Noritake Seo (瀬尾 乃武, 1899–1997), Japanese noh performing artist and late certified Living National Treasure of Japan
 Reiko Seo (瀬尾 礼子), Japanese actress
 Shōtarō Seo (瀬尾 祥太郎), Japanese music lyricist, composer and arranger
 Taemi Seo (瀬尾 妙実, also known as Kim Myo-shil (김묘실; 金妙実), born 1965), a retired North Korean-Japanese figure skater
 Takahiro Seo (瀬尾 尚弘, born 1971), Japanese kickboxer
 Takeshi Seo (瀬尾 健, 1940–1944), Japanese engineer, academic and professor
 Takumichi Seo (瀬尾 拓慶), Japanese photographer
 Takuya Seo (瀬尾 卓也, born 1984), Japanese actor
 Tatsuya Seo (瀬尾 達也, born 1960), Japanese motorboat racer 
 Tomomi Seo (瀬尾 智美), Japanese retired football player
 Tomomi Seo (瀬尾 智美, born 1969), Japanese actress, voice actress and narrator
 Tsukasa Seo (瀬尾 つかさ), Japanese light novelist
 Yasutsugu Seo (瀬尾 育弐), Japanese medical engineer, medical technologist and professor
 Yutaka Seo (瀬尾 裕, 1916–1988), Japanese translator and academic

Fictional characters
As a surname (Japan)
 Akira Seo (瀬尾 晶), a character in the Japanese adult visual novel Tsukihime Plus-Disc 
 Hiroyuki Seo (瀬尾 弘之), a character in the Japanese film Was I Really Ugly?
 Hitomi Seo (瀬尾 仁美), a character in the Japanese film Memory Investigation ~ Shinjuku East Station Case File
 Kaoru Seo (瀬尾 香), a character in the Japanese manga series Sekirei
 Karen Seo (瀬尾 かれん), a character in the Japanese CD drama In The Seasons Around
 Ken'ichi Seo (瀬尾 謙一), a character in the Japanese TV drama Smiling Angel
 Kenji Seo (瀬尾 健司), a character in the Japanese novel The Tender Lance of Sara
 Mitsuki Seo (瀬尾 みづき), a character in the Japanese video game Jewel BEM Hunter Lime
 Mitsuko Seo (瀬尾 美津子), a character in the Japanese film Was I Really Ugly?
 Narumi Seo (瀬尾 鳴海), a character in the Japanese mobile game Stand My Heroes
 Seo (瀬尾), a character in the Japanese TV drama Smiling Angel
 Seo (瀬尾), a character in the Japanese film The Young General Who Returned
 Shōji Seo (瀬尾彰二), a character in the Japanese animated film Symphony in August - Shibuya 2002～2003
 Naomi Seo (瀬尾 直美), a character in the Japanese adult game Black Fragment: Mystery of Necronomicom
 Ritsuko Seo (瀬尾 リツ子), a character in the Japanese TV drama LOVE STORY IN NEW YORK
 Ryūji Seo (瀬尾 竜二), a character in the Japanese TV drama Love Again
 Sayaka Seo (瀬尾 さやか), a character in the Japanese TV drama LOVE STORY IN NEW YORK
 Shizune Seo (瀬尾 静音), a character in the Japanese animated film The Garden of Sinners: Future Gospel
 Takayuki Seo (瀬尾孝之), a character in the Japanese TV drama I Will Deliver That Edge - The Story of Mercari -
 Tomoya Seo (瀬尾 智也), a character in the Japanese manga Assassination Classroom
 Tosuke Seo (瀬尾 斗介), a character in Japanese historical TV drama The Scream
 Yasumasa Seo (瀬尾 泰正), a character in the Japanese TV drama The Sun Rises Again
 Yūdai Seo (瀬尾 雄大), a character in the Japanese TV drama A3
 Yukako Seo (瀬尾 由加子), a character in the Japanese stage play KINSHU
 Yūzō Seo (瀬尾 雄三), a character in the Japanese multimedia series Green Horizon
 Yuzuki Seo (瀬尾 結月), a character in the Japanese manga Monthly Girls' Nozaki-kun
As a surname (South Korea)
 Chairman Seo Byung-ki (서병기), a character in the South Korean TV drama Tracer
 Seo Ji-seok (서지석) , a character in the South Korean TV drama Angel's Revenge

See also
List of Korean surnames
Xú
Seno (disambiguation)

References

Surnames
Korean-language surnames
Japanese-language surnames